This article is a list of events in the year 2017 in Senegal.

Incumbents
 President: Macky Sall 
 Prime Minister: Mohammed Dionne

Events
30 July - The 2017 parliamentary election takes place, which re-elects Mohammed Dionne for Prime Minister of Senegal.

Sports

Génération Foot won the Senegal Premier League football championship

Deaths
25 April – Issa Samb, painter, sculptor, performance artist, playwright and poet (b. 1945).

References

 
2010s in Senegal
Years of the 21st century in Senegal
Senegal
Senegal